The 2022 Super Rugby Pacific season (known as Harvey Norman Super Rugby Pacific in Australia and DHL Super Rugby Pacific in New Zealand) is the 27th season of Super Rugby, an annual rugby union competition organised by SANZAAR between teams from Australia, Fiji, New Zealand, Samoa and Tonga. Due to the COVID-19 pandemic, the previous seasons were replaced with Super Rugby Unlocked, Super Rugby Aotearoa and Super Rugby AU in 2020, and Super Rugby Aotearoa, Super Rugby AU, and Super Rugby Trans-Tasman in 2021. The 2022 edition will revert to a 12-team competition, with a single pool replacing the geographical conference system, as well as introducing a new name for the reformatted competition. The season is expected to run from 18 February, with the final to be played on 18 June - culminating before the start of the mid-year international window.

The newly created  franchise, representing players from Samoa and Tonga and other Pacific Islands, also successfully put forth a bid to join the competition. The  also returned to Super Rugby, following their exclusion at the end of the 2017 Super Rugby season and following on from their inclusion in Super Rugby AU and Super Rugby Trans-Tasman in both 2020 and 2021.

The competition was again affected by the COVID-19 pandemic, with the competitions fixtures being revised in December 2021, due to border restriction in New Zealand. Then in January, the  announced their Round 1 and Round 4 home matches would be swapped to away matches, due to border restrictions in Western Australia.

Competition format

The 12 participating teams will not be divided into geographical conferences, instead playing 14 regular season games: the 12 teams facing each other once in a home-and-away format for 11 games, and the remaining 3 games to be played with an emphasis on derby matches; with the Fijian Drua associated with the Australian sides and Moana Pasifika with the New Zealand sides, given they were based there. It is likely that the Drua and Moana Pasifika will also develop a rivalry, both being Pacific Island teams.

The top eight teams at the conclusion of the regular season qualified for the play-offs. For the quarterfinals, the first-ranked team played the eighth-ranked team, the second-ranked team played the seventh-ranked, the third-ranked played the sixth-ranked and the fourth-ranked team played the fifth-ranked. The quarterfinal winners progressed to the Semifinal, and the winners of the semifinals advanced to the final. The higher ranked team hosted each playoff match.

Standings

Round-by-round

The table below shows each team's progression throughout the season. For each round, their cumulative points total is shown with the overall log position in brackets:

Matches

The fixtures for the 2022 Super Rugby Pacific competition were released on 15 November 2021. On 23 December 2021, a revised draw was announced due to complications surrounding the COVID-19 pandemic.

Finals

The finals fixtures were as follows:

Quarterfinals

Semifinals

Final

Statistics

Leading point scorers

Source: Points

Leading try scorers

Source: Tries

Discipline

Players

Squads

The following squads have been named. Players listed in italics denote non-original squad members:

Referees
The following referees were selected to officiate the 2022 Super Rugby Pacific season:

References

External links
 Super Rugby websites:
 SANZAAR Super Rugby
 Australia Super Rugby
 New Zealand Super Rugby

2022
2022 in Australian rugby union
2022 in Fijian rugby union
2022 in New Zealand rugby union
2022 in Samoan rugby union
2022 in Tongan rugby union
2022 rugby union tournaments for clubs
2022 Super Rugby Pacific season